Włodzimierz Chlebosz (born 14 January 1967) is a Polish weightlifter. He competed in the men's middleweight event at the 1992 Summer Olympics.

References

1967 births
Living people
Polish male weightlifters
Olympic weightlifters of Poland
Weightlifters at the 1992 Summer Olympics
Sportspeople from Wrocław
21st-century Polish people
20th-century Polish people